Seçkin Özdemir (born 25 August 1981) is a Turkish actor and former TV presenter, radio personality and disc jockey (DJ). His mother is of Turkish descent, from Xanthi, Greece (Turkish minority live in Xanthi). His mother was born in Greece and immigrated to Turkey. His father is from Sinop. Seçkin has established himself as a leading actor in Turkey with roles in several of the highly successful television series, that includes The Girl with the Red Scarf (2011), Bir Aşk Hikâyesi (2013), Günahkar (2014), Acı Aşk (2015) and Kuruluş: Osman (2020).

Filmography

Television

Film

References

External links 

1981 births
Living people
Turkish television presenters
Turkish radio presenters
Turkish male film actors
Turkish male television actors
Male actors from Istanbul